Tabachnik or Tabachnyk (Cyrillic: Табачник) is a gender-neutral Slavic surname meaning either a smoker or tobacco merchant. It may refer to

 Anne Tabachnick (1927–1995), American painter
Dmytro Tabachnyk (born 1963), Ukrainian politician
 Eldred Tabachnik (born 1943), South African barrister
Jan Tabachnyk (born 1945), Ukrainian composer, accordionist, politician and entrepreneur
Josef Tabachnyk (born 1947), Ukrainian-born sculptor 
 Michel Tabachnik (born 1942), Swiss musician
 Pablo Tabachnik (born 1977), Argentinian table tennis player

See also
 Tabachnik Garden, Jerusalem, Israel

References